Charlotte von Hezel, also known as Charlotte Henriette Hezel (née Schwabe; 8 January 1755, in Ilmenau – 3 April 1817, in Dorpat) was a German writer, editor and journalist. She was the first woman to publish a magazine under her own name, the Wochenblatt für's Schöne Geschlecht (English: "The Weekly Newspaper for the Fair Sex").

Life and work 
Hezel was the only daughter of four children of the pastor and superintendent Johann Wilhelm Schwabe and his wife Dorothea Crusius, a "talented Gelegenheitsdichterin (occasional poet)".

She received a literary and musical education in her parents' house. Her three brothers received a university education and worked as ministers, lawyers and doctors. Hezel was mainly taught by her brother Heinrich Elias.

On 14 June 1778, Charlotte married the private tutor and linguistic scholar Johann Wilhelm Friedrich von Hezel, with whom she initially lived near Ilmenau where Hezel, who had since been appointed imperial palatine, completed seven volumes of his Bible work with the help of his wife. Their sons had two sons and two daughters. Son Johann Karl Wilhelm Friedrich von Hezel (1786–1831) completed a degree in philosophy and worked as a lawyer; the names and resumes of the other children are not known.

In 1779, Hezel began to publish her newspaper, Wochenblatt für's Schöne Geschlecht, in Ilmenau. She was the first woman to publish a magazine – four years before Sophie von La Roche with her Pomona: Für Teutschlands Töchter (English: Pomona: For Germany's Daughters). Hezel not only dealt with topics such as fashion and housekeeping in the magazine, but also wanted to contribute to the education of women and published texts on art history and literature, on medicine and other scientific contributions.

With the publication of this weekly, Charlotte von Hezel made a name for herself in the literary public and from then on was considered a literary and politically ambitious writer and editor.

In 1786, her husband accepted an appointment as a "professor of exegesis and oriental literature" in Giessen, where the Hezel family lived until 1801. During this time, Henriette Hezel alongside other wives of University of Giessen lecturers founded the Women's Reading Society, using her friendship with Christoph Gottlieb von Murr. In 1801 the von Giessen family moved to Dorpat after Wilhelm Friedrich Hezel accepted a job there.

Weekly Paper for the Fair Sex
Women's magazines gradually became popular at the beginning of the 18th century (The world's first women's magazine "The Ladies' Mercury" appeared in 1693). Initially, the writings were published by men, until 1779 the Hamburg woman Ernestine Hofmann – anonymously and without revealing her female identity – was the first woman to publish the sheet for Hamburg's daughters, but hit "behind the fictitious authority of a wise old ... counsellor and woman friend". Charlotte von Hezel followed her in the same year, also anonymously, but was open about the fact that she was a woman, and gave clear indications about her real-life identity.

The magazine was published twice a week, on Wednesdays and Saturdays, with a length of eight pages each. The issues were mainly devoted to art and artist stories,Frauenzimmer- Dietetik, and the display of new writings. Hezel sought to convey to women the content of the weekly newspaper knowledge that went beyond the area of family life and the effectiveness of contemporary women, which was largely limited to home and family.

The title page was often adorned with a gloss or a poem. In the first edition, Hezel published one of her own poems.

For the first time in a weekly there was a series of articles dealing with the women's diets from a popular medical point of view. According to the editor, these were written by a doctor; however, she does not name the author. Possibly it was Hezel's brother Ernst Schwabe , who was a medical professor in Giessen.

Another section contained popular scientific treatises, for example "About the Age of Sealing Wax or Spanish Waxes" or "History of the Engraving Art", while fictional entertainment played no role in the script.

The weekly only appeared in four booklets for eight months, according to von Hezel, not because there was a lack of subscribers, but because the then unreliable postal distribution channels caused too many difficulties. In a last post, Hezel made her displeasure with the Nuremberg  and the difficulties and delays in public postal delivery.

Archangeli had 163 subscribers, both male and female.

Women's Reading Society
In 1786, Charlotte von Hezel and other wives of Giessen university professors founded a women's reading society in which men were denied access by statute ("... where no hint of a male nation should touch the room ..."). The founders cooperated with the bookseller Friedrich Justus warrior who created the logistical requirements, so the premises and the book and journal collection made available. Only the participants decided on the membership and composition of their library – a novelty at that time.

With von Hezel's departure, Christiane Crome, the sister of August Wilhelm Crome, professor of photography science in Giessen, continued the reading circle, whose fate is unknown.

References

Further reading
 Christine Haugg: Female sociability and literary conspiracy in the run-up to the French Revolution – About the project to found a women's reading society in Giessen 1789/1790.
 Helga Neumann: Zwischen Emanzipation und Anpassung. Protagonistinnen des deutschen Zeitschriftenwesens im ausgehenden 18. Jahrhundert (1779–1795). Würzburg: Königshausen und Neumann , 1999,  (in German).
 Charlotte Henriette Hezel: weekly paper for the fair sex. Reprint of the 1779 edition. With an afterword by Hans Henning. Edition Leipzig, 1967.
 Ezra Greenspan, Jonathan Rose: Book History. Volume 2. Penn State Press 1999.  (English).
 Carl Wilhelm August von Schindel: The German Writers of the 19th Century. Leipzig 1823, pp. 212f.
 Baltic Historical Commission (ed.): Entry to Johann Karl Wilhelm Friedrich von Hezel. In: BBLD – Baltic biographical lexicon digital
 Hans Henning (ed.): Weekly newspaper for the fair sex. Leipzig 1967, Weckel. Pp. 59–74
 Heinrich Döring: The learned theologians of Germany in the eighteenth and nineteenth centuries. Publisher JKG Wagner, 1831, p. 728 ff.

1755 births
1817 deaths
18th-century German women writers
19th-century German women writers
19th-century German journalists
German women journalists
18th-century German journalists
Occasional poets
18th-century women journalists